Grigori Kromanov (8 March 1926 in Tallinn – 18 July 1984 in Lahe, Lääne-Virumaa) was an Estonian theatre and film director. He directed some of the best known Estonian movies, including Viimne reliikvia (The Last Relic) and Dead Mountaineer's Hotel.

His 1976 film  Diamonds for the Dictatorship of the Proletariat  is based on the homonymous 1974 detective novel by Yulian Semyonov.

References

Further reading 
 Director Grigori Kromanov: memoirs, articles, letters, diaries. Compiled by Irena Veisaitė-Kromanova  (1995)

External links 
 

1926 births
1984 deaths
Estonian film directors
Soviet film directors
People from Tallinn
Estonian people of Russian descent
Academic staff of the Estonian Academy of Music and Theatre